Glossostelma is a plant genus in the family Apocynaceae, first described as a genus in 1895. It is native to Africa .

Species
 Glossostelma angolense Schltr. - Angola
 Glossostelma brevilobum Goyder -  Zaïre, Burundi, Tanzania, Malawi
 Glossostelma cabrae (De Wild.) Goyder -  Zaïre
 Glossostelma carsonii (N.E.Br.) Bullock - Gabon
 Glossostelma ceciliae (N.E.Br.) Goyder - Zimbabwe, Mozambique
 Glossostelma erectum (De Wild.) Goyder -  Zaïre
 Glossostelma lisianthoides (Decne.) Bullock - Angola
 Glossostelma mbisiense Goyder -  Tanzania
 Glossostelma nyikense Goyder -  Malawi, Zambia 
 Glossostelma rusapense Goyder -  Zimbabwe
 Glossostelma spathulatum (K.Schum.) Bullock - Angola
 Glossostelma xysmalobioides (S.Moore) Bullock - Angola

References

Apocynaceae genera
Asclepiadoideae